Adolf (or Adolph) Ritter von Heinleth (24 October 1823 – 26 February 1895) was a Bavarian General der Infanterie and War Minister under Ludwig II of Bavaria and under Otto of Bavaria.

Biography 
Von Heinleth was born in Munich as son of a judicial counselor (Appellations-Gerichtsrat). He started his military career in the Infanterie-Leib-Regiment. After passing his company officer career, since 1858 in the rank of a Hauptmann, he became Major of the general staff in 1866. During the Franco-Prussian War he served in the rank of an Oberstleutnant, later in the rank Oberst, as chief of staff of the I Royal Bavarian Corps, which was led by General Von der Tann. After his advancement to Major General and Brigadier he stood with the occupation brigade in Metz after 1875. In 1878 he became
Chief of the General Staff of the Army, and in 1882 he became Lieutenant General and division commander, before he served as war minister from 1 May 1885 to 9 May 1890.<ref
name="HdBG">Heinleth, Adolf von, House of the Bavarian history (HdBG).</ref> Ritter von Heinleth withdrew for health reasons. He died in Munich, where he was buried in the Old Southern Cemetery.

Awards 
 Military Order of Max Joseph

Notes and references

External links 
"Heinleth, Adolf von" at Wikisource. Allgemeine Deutsche Biographie (1905) 

Bavarian Ministers of War
Bavarian generals
Knights of the Military Order of Max Joseph
Military personnel from Munich
People from the Kingdom of Bavaria
1823 births
1895 deaths